Pigs Is Pigs is a 1954 animated film by Walt Disney Studios. Based on the story "Pigs Is Pigs" by Ellis Parker Butler, it relates the tale of a railway agent and his problems with a shipment of two guinea pigs that proceed to breed rapidly. The cartoon was animated in the flat, colorful UPA style. The melody of the traditional Irish jig "The Irish Washerwoman" is repeated throughout the short.

Plot 
Flannery is a station manager who carries out all his activities based on his company's manual. However, everything changes when he receives a shipment of two guinea pigs. Because the box calls them "guinea pigs", he is confident that the animals in the shipment are indeed pigs, so he demands that the receiver of the box, McMorehouse, pay him 48 cents to send them to him. McMorehouse considers this an exorbitant price for a box of pets and refuses to pay.
Flannery sends a message to the head office to inquire about the status of the guinea pigs, i.e. whether they are officially considered pigs or pets. However, when he had not yet received a reply, the guinea pigs start having lots of offspring and in just a few days, they overrun the whole station. At the company headquarters, a "zoologist", with his facts, came to the exact and correct conclusion that guinea pigs are not real pigs, so the 44 cent rate applies. So when the company sent the reply to Flannery, he travels to McMorehouse's house to give the guinea pigs to him, but McMorehouse has moved away. There was nothing in the manual to cover the case, so Flannery sent a message telling the company that the final decision is up to them. When the company decided to have the guinea pigs sent back to the main office, thanks to a suggestion from a worker at the office, Flannery transfers the animals to the station's head office. When he exits, he finds out that the animals were admitted to the circus! At the end of the short, Flannery made this vow; "No more will I be a fool. Whenever it comes to livestock, blast every single rule! If the animals come in singles or if they come in sets, if they got 4 feet and they're alive, they'll be classified as pets!".

Academy Awards
It was nominated for an Academy Award for Best Animated Short Film.

Home media
The short was released on December 6, 2005, on Walt Disney Treasures: Disney Rarities - Celebrated Shorts: 1920s–1960s.

References

External links

 

1954 films
1950s Disney animated short films
1954 animated films
Rail transport films
Films directed by Jack Kinney
Films produced by Walt Disney
Films scored by Oliver Wallace
1950s English-language films